The 2018 Fresno State Bulldogs football team represented California State University, Fresno in the 2018 NCAA Division I FBS football season. The Bulldogs were led by second-year head coach Jeff Tedford and played their home games at Bulldog Stadium. They were a member of the Mountain West Conference in the West Division.

In one of the best seasons in program history, the Bulldogs finished the season 12–2, 7–1 in Mountain West play, to be champions of their conference's West Division. They represented the West Division in the Mountain West Championship Game, where they defeated Boise State to become Mountain West champions. They were invited to the Las Vegas Bowl where they defeated Arizona State. Their 12 wins were the most wins in a single season in school history.

Previous season

The Bulldogs finished the 2017 season 10–4, 7–1 in Mountain West play to win the West Division. They lost to Mountain Division champion Boise State in the Mountain West Championship Game. They were invited to the Hawaii Bowl where they defeated Houston.  They became only the second team in college football history to win ten games the year after they lost ten or more games (1–11 in 2016).

Recruiting

Position key

Recruits

The Bulldogs signed a total of 17 recruits.

Preseason

Award watch lists
Listed in the order that they were released

Mountain West media days
During the Mountain West media days held July 24–25 at the Cosmopolitan on the Las Vegas Strip, the Bulldogs were predicted as favorites to win the West Division title.

Media poll

Preseason All-Mountain West Team
The Bulldogs had two players selected to the preseason all-Mountain West team.

Offense

KeeSean Johnson – WR

Defense

Jeffrey Allison – LB

Schedule

Sources:

Game summaries

Idaho

Junior defensive back Jaron Bryant was named the Mountain West Special Teams Player of the Week after returning two blocked field goals for touchdowns.

at Minnesota

at UCLA

Toledo

at Nevada

Wyoming

at New Mexico

Hawaii

at UNLV

at Boise State

San Diego State

San Jose State

at Boise State (Mountain West Championship Game)

vs. Arizona State (Las Vegas Bowl)

Rankings

Honors

Mountain West

Jeff Allison is the defensive player of the year in the Mountain West Conference.

Players drafted into the NFL

References

Fresno State
Fresno State Bulldogs football seasons
Mountain West Conference football champion seasons
Las Vegas Bowl champion seasons
Fresno State Bulldogs football